Peter Kenneth Obst (1937–2017) was an Australian rules footballer who played with Port Adelaide and Woodville in the South Australian National Football League (SANFL). During his time at Port Adelaide he was a member of the club's record six premierships in a row, winning the club's best and fairest in the fifth premiership year during 1962. He left Port Adelaide in 1965 to take up a coaching offer at Woodville where he stayed for three years, winning that club's leading goal-kicker award in 1967. He returned to Port Adelaide for the last two years of his playing career.

Post-playing he worked as a football commentator for the ABC.

His father Ken Obst, brother Trevor Obst and son Andrew Obst were also accomplished footballers.

He died on 11 May 2017, aged 80.

References

External links 

1937 births
2017 deaths
Australian rules footballers from South Australia
Port Adelaide Football Club (SANFL) players
Port Adelaide Football Club players (all competitions)
Woodville Football Club players
Woodville Football Club coaches